Kopai railway station is a railway station of Sahibganj loop line under Howrah railway division of Eastern Railway zone. It is situated at Kaluraypur, Kopai in Birbhum district in the Indian state of West Bengal.

References

Railway stations in Birbhum district
Howrah railway division